The Iowa Department of Natural Resources (Iowa DNR or IA DNR) is a department/agency of the U.S. state of Iowa formed in 1986, charged with maintaining state parks and forests, protecting the environment of Iowa, and managing energy, fish, wildlife, land resources, and water resources of Iowa.

History
The DNR was created by the 71st General Assembly in 1986 under Terry E. Branstad, member of the Republican Party of Iowa, by combining four previous state agencies: Water, Air, and Waste Management; parts of the Iowa Energy Policy Council; the Iowa Conservation Commission; and the Iowa Geological Survey Organization.

Directors of the DNR since its formation in 1986 have been
 Larry J. Wilson, 1986-1999, Chief of Iowa Conservation Commission
Paul Johnson, 1999–2000 M.S in Forestry
Lyle Asell, 2000 (acting), B.S. Fish and Wildlife Biology, Governor Vilsack
Jeffrey R. Vonk, 2001-2006, Wildlife Management, B.S. Forest Biology.
Richard Leopold, 2007-2010, naturalist
Roger Lande, 2010-2012, lawyer
Chuck Gipp, 2012–2018, dairy farmer
Kayla Lyon, 2019–present

Organization
The DNR has 1,170 full-time equivalent employees. It is headed by a governor-appointed director, which as of May 2012 has been Chuck Gipp.
The DNR has three service divisions: Conservation and Recreation, Environmental Services and Management Services.

There are two governor-appointed citizen commissions that decide on policies and administrative rules: the Natural Resource Commission that oversees fish, wildlife, parks and forestry issues; and the nine-member Environmental Protection Commission that oversees water, land and air quality issues.

Environmental Protection Commission 
The Commission consists of nine commissioners. Of these at least 5 members have been identified in 2014 based on public records, to have a conflict of interest when it comes to stricter environmental protections, particularly the enforcement of the Clean Water Act.
Nancy Couser owns feedlots and confinements housing 5,200 cattle.
Cindy Greiman, whose husband owns feedlots and confinements housing 3,794 cattle.
Brent Rastetter owns two confinements housing 9,200 hogs and is the CEO of Quality Ag Builders Inc., a company that builds confinements and manure pits. He is a major Branstad campaign donor. 
Max Smith owns a hog gestation factory farm that houses 4,117 hogs.
Gene Ver Steeg, former president of the Iowa Pork Producers Association, owns confinements housing 20,000 hogs and had a manure spill at one of his operations in fall 2013. An April 2013 Wall Street Journal article quoted him saying that "Clean Water Act regulations were a waste of money".

Division of Environmental Services
As of 2013 it consisted of five bureaus: Water Quality, Air Quality, Land Quality, Field Services and Compliance, and Iowa Geological and Water Survey. 
Field Services staff inspect permitted facilities, annually reviewing permits for more than 200 confined animal facilities, approximately 5,500 manure management plans, permitting more than 450 solid waste facilities and writing more than 2,000 air permits.

Water Quality
Iowa water quality assessments have been developed only since 1992.
In 2013, the Iowa Geological and Water Survey published a "Survey of Iowa Groundwater and Evaluation of Public Well Vulnerability Classifications for Contaminants of Emerging Concern". The most commonly found contaminant was pesticides in 41% of samples, with as many as 6 pesticide compounds together, and mostly chloroacetanilide degradates. Glyphosate was not detected, and its metabolite was only detected in two of 60 wells (3%) at the detection limit of 0.02 μg/L. In 35% of 63 samples pharmaceutical compounds were found. Of the 14 drugs, six were above the method reporting limit, the highest of which was acetaminophen. One in five of the wells contained microorganisms,
most frequently pepper mild mottle virus (PMMV), GII norovirus, both human and bovine polyomavirus, and Campylobacter.

As of 2014, the Iowa Geological and Water Survey no longer appears in the DNR organization chart, as its eight scientists became part of the Iowa Institute of Hydraulic Research (IIHR) Hydroscience & Engineering at the University of Iowa.

As of 2016, the most recent Iowa's impaired water list is from 2014. It contained 571 waterbodies with a total of 754 impairments.

Division of Conservation and Recreation Services
The division assists in wildlife population surveys, provides conservation information to the public, and conducts hunter, boater, ATV and snowmobile safety programs. 
The division formerly consisted of seven bureaus: A 'Fisheries Bureau', a 'Wildlife Bureau' managing  of public land for recreational use, a 'Forestry Bureau', a 'State Parks Bureau' a 'Land and Waters Bureau', an 'Engineering Services Bureau' and a 'Law Enforcement Bureau' where conservation officers enforce laws related to fish, wildlife, boating, snowmobiling and all-terrain vehicles.

, the division had only six bureaus, because the Engineering Services Bureau and the Land/Waters Bureau merged to Engineering Land/Waters.

Forestry Bureau

It provides technical assistance to Iowa tree, forest and prairie owners and businesses with forestry and prairie management planning, cost-share programs and education. It operates state nurseries in Ames, Iowa and Montrose, Iowa producing 4 million tree and shrub seedlings annually at low cost to the public for erosion control, wildlife habitat and reforestation.

Parks Bureau

The 'Parks Bureau' operates and maintains 84 parks and recreation areas with trails and cabins for camping, picnicking, swimming, boating and fishing. It is responsible for more than 90 state preserves set aside for their natural or cultural significance and supervises programs in recreation planning and resource protection.

Budget
The department receives less than 1 percent of the state’s general tax appropriations since it was founded, "routinely ranking among the lowest states in per capita spending on environmental protection".
The DNR's annual budget as of 2013 was $213 million.
Of that, only 6.7 percent is appropriated from the state general fund with the remainder from sources such as non-general fund
appropriations, fees and federal funds. The general fund is critical, with about 35 percent used to leverage federal dollars and more than 50 percent used for state parks and state forests operation. The remaining 15% serves to bridge other funding sources that make up the operating budget.

Criticism and lawsuits
In 2011, three environmental groups sued the US EPA to bring DNR's Concentrated Animal Feeding Operations (CAFO) program into compliance with the Clean Water Act.

In January 2015, the Des Moines Water Works declared its intent to file a lawsuit against three Iowa counties Buena Vista, Sac, and Calhoun county where groundwater water tests had shown nitrate levels as high as 39.2 mg/L, which was 4 times the federally required Safe Drinking Water Act limit of 10 mg/L as the DNR continued not to enforce the Clean Water Act.

Magazine
IDNR produces Iowa Outdoors magazine with a reported monthly circulation of 40,000.

See also
List of law enforcement agencies in Iowa
List of State Fish and Wildlife Management Agencies in the U.S.

References

External links
 

State agencies of Iowa
 
State environmental protection agencies of the United States
Natural resources agencies in the United States
1986 establishments in Iowa